Sarhari (سرھاڙي) is a small town of tehsil Shahdadpur, Sanghar District, Sindh province, Pakistan. It is on the Main Railway Line. It is known for its large exports of bananas.

Sarhari is linked with Shahdadpur,  New Saeedabad of Matiari District, and Sakrand of Shaheed Benazirabad District by road. It is also connected with Nawabshah by road. Nawabshah fifth largest city of Sindh is 20 km from Sarhari.

Sarhari is very famous business town specially for market of clothes, sweet desserts and fruits.

There is a Rural Health Centre Sarhari and a Government Higher Secondary School Sarhari Also.

Sarhari is a town committee also.

It is an agricultural town and it produces a fine variety of cotton and wheat

References

It is an agricultural town and it produces a fine variety of cotton and wheat 

Populated places in Sindh